Kathryn Ballard Shut (born 1972) (pronounced \ˈshüt\, as in the English word "shoot") is an American jazz pianist, vocalist, music producer, composer, author, promoter, syndicated radio music host, and president of TIMKAT Entertainment, LLC, an independent record label based in Denver, Colorado, United States.  Her father was the late trumpeter, saxophonist, and vocalist, Tim Ballard, whom was honored as an inductee into the Kansas Music Hall of Fame (2008, as member of Capitol Records recording artists, Garry Mac and the Mac Truque (1969–1971)).

Early life and education 

Ballard Shut was born in 1972 in Oklahoma City, Oklahoma, but after her parents divorced in August 1977, moved to Kansas City, Missouri when she was four years old. She was raised by her mother Sharyn and step-father, J. Michael Pendergist, in Eastern Jackson County, Missouri (Kansas City), from 1977 to 1995 and lived in the area again from 1999 to 2000.  Her first and primary instrument was the piano at age 8, but starting in fifth grade, she also earned the first chair clarinet spot in the school band. However, Ballard Shut deeply wanted to play in jazz band, and upon learning that clarinetists were only welcome in a jazz ensemble if they were also saxophonists, she switched to tenor and baritone saxophone and continued to excel on these instruments as a 'doubler' throughout high school.

Among her musical honors as a youth, she auditioned and was selected from hundreds of area-wide competitors to perform with the 1989 Kansas City All District "Blue" Jazz Band (on baritone saxophone and under the direction of saxophonist Jim Mair. Live recording: 'Splanky' at https://soundcloud.com/timkatent/all-district-kansas-city-blue-jazz-band-1988-splanky, where Ballard Shut can be easily heard on the beefy bari), and under the direction of Dr. James Popejoy, was the honored recipient on saxophone of the prestigious John Philip Sousa Band Award, granted to one band student from each American high school that demonstrated the highest quality of musical excellence within his or her senior year.  Ballard Shut was active in every musical organization offered, including all bands and also as one of only two mezzo-soprano vocalists selected to sing in the school's 40-member honor choir, Camerata, under the direction of the esteemed Mr. Noel Fulkerson. As the string orchestra did not allow saxophonists as a general rule, she instead performed in the percussion section, having learned timpani, crash cymbals, bass drum, and other auxiliary instruments at University of Central Missouri's Summer Music Camp in 1988 and 1990.  Because of her extreme musical versatility and due to often seeing her perform with a different instrument in her hand, by her senior year, fellow members of her high school band granted her an additional humorous award at the annual banquet entitled, "I Have More Instruments Than The United States Marine Corps Band".  At graduation, she held the second-largest record ever set at her school for Lettering in Music (7 times).

After graduating from Raytown Senior High School in Raytown, Missouri in 1990, she first attended the University of Central Missouri in Warrensburg, Missouri as a Music Education major from 1990–1993 and in 1993 was inducted as a lifetime member into Sigma Alpha Iota music fraternity, Epsilon Omega chapter.  Disenchanted with the rigors of the major, in 1993, Ballard Shut changed her field of study in her junior year from Music Education to Spanish, moved back home, and transferred to Rockhurst University in Kansas City, Missouri, where she graduated magna cum laude with a Bachelor of Arts in 1995.  As a result, she won a full-ride scholarship in 1995–1996 to Marquette University in Milwaukee, Wisconsin, and worked as a Teaching Assistant in the Department of Foreign Languages and Literatures.

In 1997, after leaving the program at Marquette to spend a year of self-discovery, Ballard Shut found that she could apply her honed teaching skills in the growing information technology field, eventually leading to strong experience as a data architect and leader in the data warehousing field. In 2015, Ballard Shut later graduated magna cum laude with a Master of Business Administration degree from Webster University and is currently studying for a Master of Legal Studies in Cybersecurity and Information Privacy from Drexel University.

Musical family legacy 

Ballard Shut's family was particularly musical on her father's side.  Her paternal grandmother, Velma Ballard Mitchell (née DeWeese), was first an accomplished pianist and then an organist later in life, and Velma's father, (Grover Seldon DeWeese) was a barn dance fiddler who was also the proprietor of a family farm in Miami County, Kansas. DeWeese's fiddle, passed down to her from her father, hangs in a showcase in Ballard Shut's home. Still other members of Ballard Shut's great-grandmother's family history (Esther DeWeese (née Reimal)), had been either musicians, traveling thespians, and even early silent film stars. As an adult, she is a multi-faceted musician who has performed jazz as both pianist and also woodwind "doubler" (clarinet/flute/saxes) in big bands, small jazz combos, theatre productions, and charity concerts.

Recent events 

In 2000, Ballard Shut moved from Kansas City to Denver, Colorado.  From 2002 to 2008, she served as a member of several jazz orchestras within The Colorado Jazz Workshop (CJW) under the leadership of famed trumpeter Hugh Ragin.  In 2008, after five seasons of professional coaching and performing with the organization, she left the CJW to form her own group, together with the late trumpeter and fellow CJW alumnus, Mike Evans (1955-2017), known in Denver as 'Lost Soul Jazz Combo'.  She is currently a co-composer/author, American label partner, and international press agent for the Italian jazz-funk ensemble, Camera Soul (2012–present).

In addition to collaborating with jazz & soul master and father, the late Tim Ballard, Ballard Shut has also worked closely with Latino film and music star Daniel Valdez (of films 'Zoot Suit' and 'La Bamba'; stage production, 'The Westside Oratorio'), Los Angeles-based Nigerian vocalist Douyé, and as a pianist/vocalist with Front Range (Colorado) jazz artists such as saxmen Vern Neeley, Tony Exum, Jr., and Keith Oxman; bassists Mark Diamond, Drew Morell, Mark Brostrom, Jean-Luc Davis, and Ron Bland; trumpeter Mike Evans; and vocalists Linda Theus-Lee and Amy Kay.

On October 16, 2007, largely due to her father's ailing health during his decade-long battle with cancer and to grant his wish for a company to continue his musical legacy, Ballard Shut founded TIMKAT Entertainment LLC, an independent record label devoted to producing world-class jazz and soul music.  When her father passed in June 2009, the label went dormant for three years; however, since 2012, TIMKAT has achieved positive notoriety and modest success through a strong fan following on Facebook, Twitter, Google Plus, ReverbNation, music review sites, and via Internet radio play, primarily on stations based in the US, France, Australia, and the United Kingdom, as well as several dedicated artist channels on Pandora Radio, Amazon Music, Spotify, Deezer, and Jango Radio. The label's preferred sales channels are Bandcamp and CDBABY, and it often utilizes CDBABY's extensive digital music network to distribute its albums globally via major mp3 stores such as iTunes and Amazon. The label often collaborates with other independent labels worldwide and serves as an American partner label for international distribution and marketing throughout North America.

From 2012-2016, Ballard Shut also produced and hosted a popular monthly syndicated Internet radio show called Modern Soul Sauce, dedicated to showcasing music from top independently-produced soulful artists. The syndicated program was commissioned by Jerome Demortier of Radio Kaos Caribou (Paris, France), world-premiered in October 2012, and during its four-season run, was featured on as many as 15 Internet global radio networks, with several stations continuing to air past episodes weekly.  The show helped to bring long-term exposure to over 300 independent artists, the majority of whom were not associated with the TIMKAT label.  Some of the show's best-known past artists include Will Downing, Traedonya, Incognito, Jarrod Lawson, Camera Soul, Tyler Kinchen and the Right Pieces, producer James Day, SuCh, Kenya McGuire Johnson, and Maysa Leak.

Due to her album credits, from 2008-2019, Ballard Shut was an associate and voting member of the National Academy of Recording Arts and Sciences aka "The Recording Academy", known internationally for its prestigious Grammy Awards. She is a lifetime member of ASCAP as a composer, author, and music publisher (popular music) (TIMKAT Entertainment), IPIs 6910514154 and 672818809.

Recreationally, Ballard Shut is an avid traditional recurve bow archer, as well as a former member of the Kansas City Swing Dance Club. She is a language enthusiast, a fluent speaker and translator of English and Spanish, and has basic knowledge of Russian, French, Italian, German, and some Hebrew.

Discography 
2021 -- Camera Soul - Album: Esagerato (Azzurra Music),(Writing credit: 'Dancing In The Dark' (author))
2019 -- Camera Soul – Album: Existence (Azzurra Music) (Author, American label (TIMKAT Entertainment), International Press Agent). Writing Credits: 'Colorado Sky' (author))
2017 –- Camera Soul – Album: Connections (Azzurra Music) - (Author, American label (TIMKAT Entertainment), International Press Agent).  Writing Credits: 'Now' (author), 'No Such Thing' (author), and 'The Land of the Living' (author) 
2017 – Compilation: "Luxury Soul 2017" (Expansion Records) - Writing Credits, CD 3: Camera Soul - 'Now' (author) 
2015 – Camera Soul – Album: Dress Code (Azzurra Music) - (Composer/author, American label (TIMKAT Entertainment), International Press Agent). Writing Credits: 'The Purpose' (author), 'Glow' (author), 'Push Play' (author), and 'Around The World' (co-composer, music)
2013 – Camera Soul – Album: Not For Ordinary People (Azzurra Music) - (Composer/author, American label (TIMKAT Entertainment), International Press Agent). Writing Credits: 'Not For Ordinary People' (author), 'My Heart' (author), 'Time Fades Away' (author), and 'Locked Inside' (co-composer-author)
2012 – Lost Soul – Album: Live at Pec Too! (TIMKAT Entertainment) - (Executive producer, pianist, vocalist)
2012 – Tim Ballard – Album: Singing Positive to the People: 35th Anniversary Limited Edition (TIMKAT Entertainment) - (Executive producer; Author, Liner Notes) 
2005 – Daniel Valdez and Su Teatro (Denver) – Album/Live Performance: The Westside Oratorio (Band leader, pianist)
Demo, Original Composition, Piano Solo – "Toni" Publisher: (c) 2012 TIMKAT Entertainment LLC

Articles and publications 

 Jazz Pianist/Trio: 'Luxuriating: The Yuko Mabuchi Trio' (Author, Review, Dec 1, 2017) 
 CoffeeTalk Jazz Magazine (2015–2017) - Contributing Author, Associate Copy Editor  
   * Winter/Spring 2016 Issue, Theme: "Legends" (Cover: Dave Koz)
   * "Umbria Jazz Fest Winter 23" (Artist Spotlight, International Jazz, Article)
   * "Diane Schuur – Schuur Thing" (Features, Interview) 
   * Spring/Summer 2015 Issue, Theme: "It's a Family Affair" (Cover: Gerald Albright): 
    ** "R James Fulfills 'Elizabeth's Dream'" 
    ** "The NAMM Show 2015" (Article)
    ** "Selina Albright: A Star Is Born" (Interview, 1 original photo)
    ** "Gerald Albright" (Interview)
    ** "The Brothers Lombardo" (Feature Profile)

 International Press Release Author on behalf of Italian jazz-funk and nu-disco band Camera Soul (2012–present) 
 JazzTimes Community Pages (2012–2017) 
 Contributing Author, Various Music Reviews and Entertainment Articles   
 CoffeeTalk Jazz Network Entrepreneur, Ms. Bridgette Lewis – Coffee Talk Jazz Network' (Author, Profile Piece) 
 Jazz group: Alberto Parmegiani Quintet – "Under a Shimmery Grace" (Author, Review)
 Acid Jazz group: The Motion Collective' and album, "Unstuck In Time" (Author, Review)
 Jazz ensemble: Sophisticated Lady Jazz Quartet (Review, eponymous debut album, 2014); full review published in full-color booklet of group's 2015 sophomore release, "Simpler Times" 
 Jazz-funk group Camera Soul and albums, "Dress Code" and "Not For Ordinary People"; also reported on group's invitation to perform at Umbria (Italy) Winter Jazz Fest (2015)
 Hammond B3 organist: Chris Hazelton and Boogaloo 7 (Author, Review)
 Hammond B3 organist: Tony Monaco: Celebration  (Author, Review) 
 Vocalist/composer: Douyé and album "So Much Love" (Author, Review)
 Vocalist/composer: Lorraine Feather and Grammy-nominated album "Attachments" (Author, Review) 
 Graphic Artist: J.C. Pagán (Profile Piece)
 French neo-soul band: Wine debut album "My Possibility" (Author, Review)
 Modern Soul Sauce Radio Show (Author, Article)
 March 12, 2014: Article: "Fusion Renaissance 2014"  
 March 1, 2012:  Front Page link to special article, "Millionaires in a Recession"

Radio work 

Producer, On-Air Host: 'Modern Soul Sauce Radio Show' (Syndicated, October 2012 – April 2016)
Producer, On-Air Host: 'RetroXana's Time Warp' (Live Broadcast, 80s Favorites on Live365.com via retroxana.com, 2001–2007)
Production Assistant, KCMW Jazz 91 FM – University of Central Missouri (1992–1993)

References 

Living people
Musicians from Kansas City, Missouri
Musicians from Denver
1972 births
Musicians from Oklahoma City